Sala Chaloem Thai, abbreviated as Chaloem Thai, was a former movie theatre in Bangkok, located at the corner of Ratchadamnoen Avenue and Mahachai Road near the Fort Mahakan, opposite what is now the Queen Sirikit Gallery.

This movie theatre was built in the year 1940 in the era of Field Marshal Plaek Phibunsongkhram to be another national theatre in Thailand as well as Sala Chalermkrung Royal Theatre in Wang Burapha neighbourhood. The red building's distinctive post-modern architecture was designed to harmonize with the surrounding buildings on Ratchadamnoen Avenue. The official opening ceremony took place on  February 10, 1949.

Sala Chaloem Thai was once considered one of the most popular and modern movie theatres. It was dismantled in early 1989 as a result of a cabinet resolution, because it obscured the scenery of Wat Ratchanadda and Loha Prasat. All projectors and seats were handed over to the National Film Archive. The site later became home to a Royal Pavilion Mahajetsadabadin and a memorial to King Rama III.

See more
Cinema of Thailand
List of cinemas in Thailand

References

Cinemas in Thailand
Former cinemas
Theatres in Bangkok
Theatres completed in 1949
1949 establishments in Thailand
1989 disestablishments
Demolished buildings and structures in Bangkok